Dominic Streatfeild is an author, freelance journalist and documentary maker based in the UK who specialises in military and security issues.

Documentary Work

Background

Streatfeild studied at King's College London, has served in the British Armed Forces, worked for the BBC and as an independent documentary maker and journalist.

His first book Silk Route by Rail (Trailblazer Publications, 1997) took Streatfeild a year to write and in its second edition was short-listed for the Thomas Cook Travel Book Award.

Streafeild's second book Cocaine: An Unauthorised Biography (Virgin Books, 2002) described the fascinating and disturbing rise of cocaine from the chewing of coca leaves by the South American peoples to the illegal trade in cocaine today. The life of George Jung, one of the more colourful characters in the book, was dramatised in the film Blow starring Johnny Depp.

Brainwash: The Secret History of Mind Control (Hodder & Stoughton, 2006) is Streatfeild's third book and was nominated for the Samuel Johnson Award in 2007. Inspired by John Mark's 1979 book The Search for the Manchurian Candidate, Streatfeild investigated the reality of brainwashing. The book is currently recommended as part of The Intelligence Officer's Bookshelf  by the CIA.

Streatfeild's latest book, A History of the World since 9/11 (Atlantic Books, 2011), published in February 2011, explores through a series of interlinked chapters detailing how people across the globe have been affected by the US response to the attacks on the Twin Towers in September 2001. A chapter from the book Stuff Happens was published in the Guardian Newspaper  in January 2011 detailing the failure of US Forces to secure the explosives from the weapons store at Al Qa'qaa.

Bibliography
A History of the World since 9/11 (2011)
Brainwash: The Secret History of Mind Control (2006)
Cocaine: An Unauthorized Biography (2002)
Silk Route by Rail (1997)

References

Living people
Alumni of King's College London
British writers
Year of birth missing (living people)